Anyela Galante Salerno (born February 22, 1991 in Guanare, Venezuela) is a Venezuelan model and beauty pageant titleholder who was crowned Miss World Venezuela 2015. She represented her country at the Miss World 2015.

Miss World Venezuela 2015
Anyela participated in the third edition of the Miss World Venezuela pageant that took place on July 4, 2015, in Caracas, Venezuela where she competed with other 11 candidates; at the end of the night she was crowned as Miss Venezuela World 2015 by her predecessor Debora Menicucci.

References

External links
Miss Venezuela Official Website

1991 births
Living people
Venezuelan female models
Venezuelan beauty pageant winners
People from Guanare
Miss World 2015 delegates
21st-century Venezuelan women